This is a list of the members of the Iceland Althing (Parliament) from 1995 till 1999.

Election results

List of MPs elected on 8 April 1995

Notes

1995